Ro 3-0422 is an extremely potent organophosphate acetylcholinesterase inhibitor. It is extremely toxic. The intravenous  is 20 μg/kg in mice. It is over 300 times more potent than neostigmine.

See also
Ro 3-0419

References

Acetylcholinesterase inhibitors
Organophosphates
Quinolines
Ethyl esters
Quaternary ammonium compounds
Methylsulfates